Richard Kuranda is an American director and artist of stage, cinema and television. He currently is the CEO and Artistic Director of the Raue Center for the Arts in Crystal Lake, Illinois and the current Artistic Director of Williams Street Repertory.   He resides in Illinois with his wife, the Actress Alicia Regan,  and their four children. In 2018, Raue Center and Williams Street Rep retired an 8.8 million dollar debt under his leadership. What is more noteworthy, the Center also secured a 125 year subsidized lease at $100 per year with a 25-year corporate sponsorship from Home State Bank.         In 2005, The New York Times  profiled Kuranda’s artistic and producing work at the Eugene O’Neill Memorial Theater Center and labeled him as one of the nation's top theater talents to watch (at the time he was the youngest producing director of a Tony Award-winning Theater and had just “turned around” the O’Neill by restoring its National Programs). It is noteworthy to point out Kuranda was the leader and produced all of the programs in a short-lived consolidation of all National Programs; halfway thru his tenure at the O'Neill he reversed the Board's consolidation of programs which lead to a rebirth of the O'Neill.  Kuranda has had working relations with Former Senator Bob Kerrey, Senator Christopher J. Dodds, and others. Cumulative Box Office for projects developed under his leadership; 2.9 billion US.

Biography 

Born in 1969 in North Eastern Pennsylvania, Kuranda was educated at the Jesuit Scranton Preparatory School, then attended West Virginia University as a scholarship student and at the Actors Studio program at the New School for Social Research from which he holds two Master's degrees under the guidance of Romulus Linney and Arthur Penn.  As a graduate student, he was mentored by Norman Mailer.  Kuranda has lectured at Yale, Harvard, NYU and various others.  He also served as an advocate for the United Nations in conjunction with the Universal Forum of Cultures in Barcelona 2004.

Kuranda's first professional film work was as a teenager, discovered by Pulitzer Prize-winning playwright Jason Miller.  Kuranda worked for several years as a youth in the Scranton Theater.   His first professional theatrical work was at the New Jersey Shakespeare Festival.  His film work includes a series of films with Bill Plympton, which are part of the MOMA permanent collection.  Kuranda's collaboration with Plympton helped launch the budding New York Underground Film and Video Festival helmed by Todd Phillips and Andrew Gurland.   Kuranda's early work at the Actors Studio included, amongst others,  a six-month exploration of Oedipus Rex with Al Pacino, Christopher Walken and Estelle Parsons.  Lloyd Richards, Romulus Linney, Jack Temchin, and Richard Kuranda were chronicled by the Village Voice as defining the Actors Studio Drama School at the New School for Social Research during their tenure of productions at Circle in the Square Theater Downtown at 159 Bleecker Street. Kuranda led the team at Epic Rep during a period of literary adaptations which included (amongst others): commissioning Romulus Linney to adapt Tim O'Brien's National Book winner Going After Cacciatio.

He is the former Producing Director of the Eugene O'Neill Theater Center.  He also served as the Center‘s interim Artistic Director (for The O'Neill and all its programs.) Kuranda was asked to lead the National Playwrights Conference and the Center in 2004 after Ranelli resigned. While at the O'Neill, Kuranda was credited by the New York Times as restoring confidence to its national programs as well as restoring actual programs like the Cabaret, Film, and Television along with the appointments of Michael Bush, Wendy C. Goldberg, and Oz Scott and reversing the decision of previous leadership to combine all programs under one artistic office (then J Ranelli).   James Houghton supported Kuranda through one of the most exhausting seasons of development due to J Ranelli's choice to combine all Conferences at once; the success of several Projects developed under his tenure at the O'Neill included In The Heights  and {title of show}, "Madagascar" and others which have debuted at nearly every major regional theater in the US and abroad. He served as the Head of Operations at NY's Signature Theatre Company under James Houghton.  Kuranda co-founded Epic Repertory Theater in NY and in a three-year span produced  24 off-Broadway plays including new works by David Auburn, JT Rogers, Romulus Linney, and Lee Blessing. Venues of production included the Dr2, The Peter Norton Space on 42nd St, The Quintero (formerly the Kaufman), and the Public Theater.
Kuranda was a principal at Elliott Associates; having opened doors to film production in his first three.

Kuranda is a lifetime member of The Actors Studio, and the former Director of Professional Development for The Actors Studio Drama School at the New School for Social Research (The New School) having replaced the retiring Associate Dean, Stephen Benedict.  Kuranda was recruited from the Signature Theater to come back to the West Village institution by James Lipton.  During his tenure at The New School, he led the team to expand the campus with the acquisition of the old Bell Laboratories at Westhbeth, his team took over and turned it into one of the world’s most important theater training centers in the world. The history of the space is noteworthy;  It was here that the first talking movie, the condenser microphone, the first TV broadcast, and the first binary computer were demonstrated.  The program was the third generation of Dramatic Workshop run by Erwin Piscator.  He is a member of the Dramatists Guild and The Stage Directors and Choreographers Society.  Kuranda served as a Mentor for the Kennedy Center, Arts In Crisis program. He was a member of the Visiting Committee to West Virginia University (arts) for eight years. Kuranda also served on the Board of the New School as a student representative for 3 years and a senior director/representative for 4 years.

Kuranda cites his collaborations with Bill Plympton, Jack Temchin, Al Pacino, JT Rogers, and James Lipton as defining moments in his career.  Kuranda withdrew from the public during the Monte Cristo Award Ceremony in Beverly Hills honoring Karl Malden.   His choice to retire from the "Face Fronting" position coincided with a legal victory rumored to be worth over 9 figures.

In recent years, Kuranda has focused on his family life and enjoys the small northwestern community of Crystal Lake, Illinois.  He serves locally on several Boards.

Kuranda also paints and his work is represented in several gallery shows in the US in 2022.

See also 
 Ignaz Kuranda

References

External links 

 NY Times Preston Whiteway and Richard Kuranda
The Chicago Tour Diary
The O'Neill Malden and Douglas
Universal Forum
 
 
 
 Preston Whiteway and Richard Kuranda
 
 Inside the Actors Studio
 Signature Theatre in New York City
 Home
 
 Universal Forum of Culture Barcelona 2004
 The Eugene O'Neill Theater Center | Launchpad of American Theater

1969 births
Living people
Actors Studio alumni
American theatre directors
Artists from New York City
People from Lackawanna County, Pennsylvania
The New School alumni
West Virginia University alumni
People from Crystal Lake, Illinois